Charles Arthur William Gilbert (9 January 1855 – 28 September 1937) was an English cricketer. Gilbert was a right-handed batsman bowled both right-arm slow and right-arm fast. He was born at Melton Mowbray, Leicestershire.

Gilbert made two appearances in first-class cricket for Surrey against Middlesex at Lord's in 1877, and Cambridge University at The Oval in 1878. Gilbert scored a total of 25 runs in his two matches, top–scoring with 17 not out. After travelling England playing minor cricket, Gilbert eventually played for Staffordshire, making his Minor Counties Championship debut for the county against Worcestershire in what was the first season of minor counties cricket. He played three more times for Staffordshire in 1895, before making a final Minor Counties Championship appearance in the following season against Northumberland.

He died at Primrose Hill, London on 28 September 1937.

References

External links
Charles Gilbert at ESPNcricinfo
Charles Gilbert at CricketArchive

1855 births
1937 deaths
Sportspeople from Melton Mowbray
Cricketers from Leicestershire
English cricketers
Surrey cricketers
Staffordshire cricketers